Half-Rate Honeymoon (Hungarian: Nászút féláron) is a 1936 Hungarian romance film directed by Steve Sekely and starring Irén Ágay, Pál Jávor and Gyula Kabos. A Hungarian couple take advantage of a cut-price holiday offer in Italy where they visit many of the major sights. A German-language version Hochzeitsreise zu 50% was also released.

Cast
 Irén Ágay - Kovács Kató
 Pál Jávor - Kerekes Pál, mérnök
 Gyula Kabos - Pernauer Lajos
 György Dénes - Ifj. Majer úr
 Mici Erdélyi - Lujza, Pernauer titkárnője és felesége
 Lajos Köpeczi-Boócz - Id. Majer úr, vezérigazgató

Bibliography
 Cunningham, John. Hungarian Cinema: From Coffee House to Multiplex. Wallflower Press, 2004.

External links

1936 films
Hungarian romantic comedy films
1930s Hungarian-language films
Films directed by Steve Sekely
Films set in Italy
Hungarian multilingual films
1936 romantic comedy films
Hungarian black-and-white films
1936 multilingual films